Charles McNeil or Charlie McNeil is the name of:

Charles McNeil (physician) (1881–1964), Scottish doctor
Charles K. McNeil (1903–1981), American gambler
Charlie McNeil (American football) (1936–1994), defensive back
Charlie McNeil (footballer) (1963–2016), Scottish footballer

See also
 Charlie McNeill (disambiguation)